Cheah Liek Hou (born 8 March 1988) is a Malaysian para-badminton player. He is an 11-time winner (both Class SU5 singles and doubles events) of the BWF Para-Badminton World Championships. He won the gold medal in the men's singles SU5 event of the 2020 Summer Paralympics, making him the first Malaysian athlete to win a medal in para-badminton. He is also the first-ever Paralympic champion in para-badminton.

Early life 
Cheah was born with Erb's palsy, which causes his right hand to have less strength and stability. He took up badminton when he was nine. He later competed against able-bodied badminton players and joined the able-bodied squad when he was 12 years old. He completed his pre-university education in Bukit Jalil Sports School. He competed in both able-bodied and para-badminton tournaments before exclusively competing in the latter upon obtaining his degree.

Personal life 
Cheah is married to Dewi Febriana Tan. He has a degree in corporate communications awarded by Universiti Putra Malaysia.

Achievements

Paralympic Games 
Men's singles SU5

World Championships
Men's singles

Men's doubles

Asian Para Games 
Men's singles

Men's doubles

Asian Championships 
Men's singles

Men's doubles

ASEAN Para Games 
Men's singles

Men's doubles

Mixed doubles

BWF Para Badminton World Circuit (7 titles) 
The BWF Para Badminton World Circuit – Grade 2, Level 1, 2 and 3 tournaments has been sanctioned by the Badminton World Federation from 2022.

Men's singles

Men's doubles

International Tournaments (33 titles, 8 runners-up) 
Men's singles

Men's doubles

References

Notes 

1988 births
Living people
People from Kuala Lumpur
Malaysian sportspeople of Chinese descent
Paralympic badminton players of Malaysia
Badminton players at the 2020 Summer Paralympics
Medalists at the 2020 Summer Paralympics
Paralympic gold medalists for Malaysia
Malaysian male badminton players
Paralympic medalists in badminton
Malaysian para-badminton players
University of Putra Malaysia alumni